The following is a list of actors, comedians and celebrities who auditioned for a part in the NBC sketch comedy series Saturday Night Live but did not get cast in the show.  Many of these celebrities managed to achieve successful careers in the entertainment industry, with some of them eventually appearing on the show as a guest host or in some other capacity.  This list is in alphabetical order by last name.

A
 Dave Attell auditioned in 1993, but was hired as a writer for the show during its 19th season instead.

B
 Charlie Barnett auditioned in 1980, but passed it up because he was self-conscious about his inability to read.
 Richard Belzer claimed that series creator Lorne Michaels promised to cast him in the show but later changed his mind.
 Sandra Bernhard came in with Marjorie Gross "into Jean’s office and did a shtick"
 Rachel Bloom auditioned in 2012.
 Kevin Brennan auditioned for a part in the Weekend Update after Colin Quinn left the show. Brennan was a writer for the show's 25th season.
 Nicole Byer auditioned in 2013 when the show was looking to add an African-American woman to the cast but lost to Sasheer Zamata.

C
 Jim Carrey auditioned in 1980. He went on to host the show three times in 1996, 2011 and 2014.  Lorne Michaels regrets not hiring Carrey.
 Louis C.K. auditioned in 1993.  He went on to host the show four times.
 Jennifer Coolidge auditioned in 1995.
 Stephen Colbert auditioned in 1992.
 David Cross auditioned in 1992.

D
 Geena Davis auditioned in 1984 but lost the part to Pamela Stephenson. She later hosted in 1989.
 Tommy Davidson auditioned in 1987 but was passed over when Lorne Michaels told him they were "not looking for a black comedian".
 Gabrielle Dennis auditioned in 2013 when the show was looking to add an African-American woman to the cast but lost to Sasheer Zamata.

F
 Dave Foley auditioned in 1985.
 The cast of ABC's Fridays (Mark Blankfield, Maryedith Burrell, Melanie Chartoff, Larry David, Rich Hall, Darrow Igus, Brandis Kemp, Bruce Mahler, Michael Richards, and John Roarke) was offered the chance to be on SNL in 1982, but all declined. Two years later, Rich Hall and Larry David would be hired on the show (Hall was a cast member while David was a writer).

G
 Zach Galifianakis auditioned in 1999.  He was eventually hired to write for two episodes of the show's 25th season.  He also hosted the show three times in 2010, 2011 and 2013.
 Jon Glaser auditioned in 1995.
 Donald Glover auditioned twice for the show only to lose the parts to Bobby Moynihan and Fred Armisen.  He eventually hosted the show in 2018.
 John Goodman  auditioned in 1980.  He later went on to host the show thirteen times.
 Kathy Griffin auditioned in 1990 but lost the part to Julia Sweeney.

H
 Tiffany Haddish auditioned in 2013 when the show was looking to add an African-American woman to the cast but lost to Sasheer Zamata. She later hosted the show during the 43rd season.
 Kevin Hart auditioned for a part in the show.  He went on to host the show several times since his failed audition.
 Rob Huebel auditioned more than once during the mid-2000s.

K
 Mindy Kaling auditioned to join Saturday Night Live but was offered to write for the show, which she turned down.
 Andy Kaufman auditioned for a spot on the original cast.
 Ellie Kemper auditioned in 2008.
 Mimi Kennedy was offered a part in the show in 1975, but Gilda Radner was worried that they were both too similar to each other.
 Kerri Kenney-Silver auditioned in 1996.
 Johnny Knoxville was offered the chance to have his stunt videos (which would later be used on the MTV show Jackass) put on SNL, but he declined the offer. He later hosted the show in 2005.
 Nick Kroll auditioned in 2008.
 Lisa Kudrow auditioned in 1990.  She later hosted the show in 1996.

M
 Bill Maher was in talks to join the 1994 season.
 Marc Maron auditioned in 1995 in attempt to replace Norm Macdonald's spot in the Weekend Update.
 Andrea Martin auditioned in 1984 but lost the part to Pamela Stephenson.
 Jack McBrayer auditioned in 2001.
 Bruce McCulloch auditioned in 1985.
 Kevin McDonald auditioned in 1985.  He was offered a part in 1995 but he turned it down.
 Adam McKay auditioned in 1995.
 T.J. Miller auditioned in 2008.
 Kel Mitchell auditioned in 2003 alongside former Kenan & Kel castmate Kenan Thompson, who was hired.
 John Mulaney auditioned in 2008. Instead, he was hired as a writer for the show during its 34th season, and later went on to host during seasons 43, 44, 45, 46, and 47.
 Arden Myrin auditioned in 2001  but lost to Amy Poehler. Later, Myrin became a Mad TV cast member.

N
 Kathy Najimy auditioned for the show in 1984, but lost to Pamela Stephenson.
 Kumail Nanjiani auditioned in 2012. He went on to host in 2017.

P
 Jordan Peele auditioned to play the role of Barack Obama on the show only to lose it to Fred Armisen. 
 Aubrey Plaza auditioned in 2008.  Plaza also worked as an intern of the show three years prior. She later hosted during the 48th season.

R
 Paul Reubens auditioned in 1980 only to lose the part to Gilbert Gottfried.  Reubens claims Gottfried was favored over him because he was friends with one of the producers of the show. Reubens later hosted in 1985.
 Mercedes Ruehl auditioned in 1980, but was passed over in favor of Denny Dillon.
 John Roberts auditioned in 2008.
 Jeff Ross auditioned in 2000 for a part in the Weekend Update after Colin Quinn left the show.
 Amber Ruffin  auditioned in 2013 when the show was looking to add an African-American woman to the cast but lost to Sasheer Zamata.

S
 Akiva Schaffer auditioned in 2005.
 Paul Scheer auditioned for the show twice in 2001 and 2002.
 Amy Sedaris auditioned in 1995 in attempt to replace cast member Janeane Garofalo.
 JB Smoove auditioned in 2003 at Stand Up NY alongside a dozen other comedians, but lost out to both Kenan Thompson and Finesse Mitchell, instead becoming a staff writer with fellow hopeful, Jason Sudeikis. Interestingly, future cast-member Rob Riggle also auditioned, but was not hired until 2004.

T
 Jorma Taccone auditioned in 2005.
 Scott Thompson auditioned in 1985.
 Robert Townsend auditioned in 1980 only to lose the part to Eddie Murphy.

W
 Bresha Webb auditioned in 2013 when the show was looking to add an African-American woman to the cast but lost to Sasheer Zamata.
 Stephnie Weir auditioned in 1999 but lost to Rachel Dratch. Later, Weir became a Mad TV cast member.

References

Unsuccessfully
Saturday Night Live